Effington can refer to:

Effington Township, Minnesota
New Effington, South Dakota
"Effington", a song by Ben Folds from his album Way to Normal